Wassanaye Sanda is a 2018 Sri Lankan Sinhala romantic drama film directed by Udayakantha Warnasuriya and co-produced by the director along with Mahesh K. Bandara and H. D. Premasiri. It stars Oshadi Himasha, Piumi Hansamali and Angelo Sanjeev Barnes with Anuj Ranasinghe in lead roles along with Anula Karunathilaka and Ravindra Randeniya. The music was composed by veteran musician Rohana Weerasinghe.

A number of the scenes from the film were shot in Australia. The film had its international premiere on 8 October 2017 in Sydney, Australia, with a subsequent screening in Melbourne on 14 October.

The film was not released in Sri Lanka until 25 May 2018, with a simultaneous book launch of Wassanaye Sanda taking place when the film debuted at the Regal Cinema in Colombo. It is the 1305th (LK) Sri Lanka film in the Sinhala cinema.

Plot

Cast
 Anuj Ranasinghe as Sandesh
 Piumi Hansamali as Mihiri
 Angelo Sanjeev Barnes as Gayantha
 Anula Karunathilaka as Mihiri's mother
 Ravindra Randeniya as Sandesh's father
 Srinath Maddumage as Thusith
 Suvineetha Weerasinghe as Sandesh's mother
 Oshadi Himasha as Nathasha
 Kirula Herath as Eranga
 Giwantha Arthasath as Weda mahaththaya
 Prasanna Priyadarshana as Sisira
 Kumari Senarathna as Menaka
 Gayathri Pananwala as Malathi
 Sarath Chandrasiri as Traffic police seargent

Songs
The film contains five songs.

References

External links
 
The grand premier of Wassanaye Sanda
Official facebook page
වස්සානයේ සඳ පායයි
‘වස්සානයේ සඳ’ සිනමා විමසුම ජීවිතයට එබිකම් කිරීමකි

2018 films
2010s Sinhala-language films
2018 romantic drama films
Sri Lankan romantic drama films
Films directed by Udayakantha Warnasuriya